Mastering the Universe: He-Man and the Rise and Fall of a Billion-Dollar Idea is a 2005 book by Roger Sweet and David Wecker that recounts Sweet's work behind the scenes of the corporate culture of the 1980s American toy industry.

Description
Sweet (with his co-author and nephew David Wecker) details the creation of the Masters of the Universe toy line, its rise to immense popularity and then dizzying crash in which profits fell from a peak of $400 million in United States sales alone in 1986 to a mere $7 million in 1987. The book is primarily a view of the corporate side of creating Masters of the Universe, but details very little of the conceptual process behind inventing the individual Masters of the Universe characters and products.

References

2005 non-fiction books
Popular culture books
Masters of the Universe
Collaborative non-fiction books